Rickey Recardo Anderson (born May 21, 1953) is a former American football running back who played for the National Football League (NFL)'s San Diego Chargers in 1978. After playing in college football with South Carolina State University, he was selected by the Chargers in the third round of the 1978 NFL Draft. Anderson had three rushing attempts for eleven yards in the 1978 season, his only year in the NFL.

References

External links
NFL.com profile

1953 births
Living people
American football running backs
South Carolina State Bulldogs football players
San Diego Chargers players
People from Kingsland, Georgia